Jeanie Collier (c.1791 – 16 September 1861) was a New Zealand runholder. She was born in Monimail, Fife, Scotland. 

In 1854, she became the first woman in the history of New Zealand to be given her own land, something normally allotted to only male colonists. She had emigrated in the company of three underage nephews and her mentally challenged brother.

References

1861 deaths
New Zealand farmers
New Zealand women farmers
Scottish emigrants to New Zealand
People from Fife
1790s births
Settlers of New Zealand
19th-century Scottish women
19th-century New Zealand women